Shaheed Bhagat Singh Nagar district is one of twenty-three districts of state of Punjab, India. It is located in Doaba region. It consists of three subdivisions, Nawanshahr, Banga, and Balachaur.
There are three legislative seats in the district, Nawanshahr, Balachaur and Banga. They fall under the Anandpur Sahib Lok Sabha Constituency.

As of 2011, it is the third least populous district of Punjab (out of 22), after Barnala and Fatehgarh Sahib.

History
Shaheed Bhagat Singh Nagar district was formed from the Hoshiarpur and Jalandhar districts of Punjab on 7 November 1995, as the sixteenth district of Punjab State named from the headquarters town of Nawanshahr. Nawanshahr was founded by the migrants from Rahon near the Sutlej River as Rahon was in danger of being flooded. They named it Nawanshahar (meaning "New City"). Nawanshahr has been the stronghold of the Ghorewaha Rajputs allied to king Akbar via kinship ties.

Dewan Banna Mal Misr (Gautam) was born in Gautam Brahmin (Shori Gotra)  family of Nawanshahr. He was son of Vaid Jhanda Mal of Nawanshahr,  Dewan Banna Mal was manager with full sovereign powers of His Highness Maharaja Sir Randhir Singh Bahadur of Kapurthala's Estates in Oudh and served as Chief Minister Of Kapurthala State. Dewan Banna Mal built the temple Shivala Banna Mal near the Municipal Committee office, Nawanshahr. It was built in the year 1862 and tall and huge structure Haveli Banna Mal Di Haveli in Vaidan Mohalla in Nawanshahr. Dewan Banna Mal's sons Dewan Acchru Mal Gautam (Revenue Minister) and Dewan Sundri Mal Gautam (Revenue Minister) of Kapurthala State built Brahmkund Mandir behind Shalimar Bagh in Kapurthala. Dewan Banna Mal owned 3000 acres of land in the Mand area of Kapurthala on the bank of River Beas Bana Malwala after Dewan Banna Mal Gautam's name and Brahampur ,Phagwara  villages in Tehsil Phagwara. Descendants of Banna Mal Today lives in Kapurthala, Phagwara, New Delhi and Dehradun,  Pandit Daljit Parshad Gautam Advocate of Kapurthala Renowned Civil Lawyer of Punjab practices in Kapurthala till his death in the Year 2010, Dewan Ambika Parshad ( Accountant General of Kapurthala State) his daughter Savitri Shori Mahajan  a historian was married to The Great Historian of India and A Lawyer Vidya Dhar Mahajan , their daughters  Mridula Mukherjee And Sucheta Mahajan are Historian and Working as a Professor of Indian history in  JNU  New Delhi. 

Later, the city was developed and constructed by Lala Paramanand Bhuchar (Sareen) who was the first major scale thekedar of city. Lala Paramanand was given the first mould of large-brick design by Queen Elizabeth in the presence of the Maharaja Patiala in his courtroom as a token of gratitude to establish brick factories (Batha) in the city. Lala Paramanand build first planned Mandi (now known as old Dana Mandi) in around 1920 which even has his name "PN" on bricks and name on Foundation Stone at old Dana Mandi Gate. He resided in Lalliyan Mohalla (Lalleyan da Mohalla) situated in center of city. The mohalla have his Haveli there along with a common haveli which was residence of 100 families, a historical landmark in that mohalla made with Nanakshahi bricks.

Nawanshahr became a district in 1995 during the S. Harcharan Brar government, with strong efforts of the late S. Dilbag Singh, former Cabinet Minister and the then MLA of Nawanshahr. People of this district are economically sound. Many of the district's families have settled abroad. Consequently, much remittance is sent back to India, contributing to the district's economic development and prosperity. The prosperity of Doaba area can be appreciated by the fact that the price of land here is high, and far more than most of the districts in the state except Ludhiana and Chandigarh. Nawanshahr is rising due to the remittances from overseas Punjabis. Nawanshahr is connected to Jalandhar, Rahon and Jaijon by railway.

On 27 September 2008 at Khatkar Kalan, 8 km from Nawanshahr, the Punjab government announced that a district in the state would be named after the freedom fighter Bhagat Singh. The announcement was made by Punjab Chief Minister Parkash Singh Badal to mark the 101st anniversary of Bhagat Singh's birth. As a result, Nawanshahr district was renamed Shaheed Bhagat Singh Nagar.

Geography
The total area is 1,258 square kilometres (km2).

 SBS Nagar city has been declared by Swachh Survekshan-2020 as "the cleanest city in North India".

Healthcare
This region has abundant health facilities. There are numerous private clinics and nursing homes. Some of them claim to have the latest medical equipment. There is an adequate number of Government Hospitals, Dispensaries and Primary Health Centers in this area. The hospitals in Nawanshahr have capacity of 64 beds and are equipped with latest medical tools. Banga and Balachaur hospitals have capacities of 30 beds each. Also Mukandpur, Urapar, Sujjon, Saroya and Muzzaffarpur proved a variety of health services. Health services are available for every village in the district. Veterinary hospitals can be found in Nawanshahr, Rahon, Saroya, and Balachaur.

Demographics

According to the 2011 Census, Shaheed Bhagat Singh Nagar district has a population of 612,310, roughly equal to the nation of Solomon Islands or the US state of Vermont. This gives it a ranking of 522nd in India (out of a total of 640). Its population growth rate over the decade 2001-2011 was 4.58%. Shaheed Bhagat Singh Nagar has a sex ratio of 954 females for every 1000 males, and a literacy rate of 80.3%. Scheduled Castes made up 42.51% of the population.

Religion

Language

In 2022, 96.63% of the population spoke Punjabi and 1.2% Hindi as their first language.

Politics

Notable residents
 Jazzy B, Indo-Canadian singer
 Amrish Puri, Indian actor
 Madan Puri, Indian actor
 B.R. Chopra, film director and producer
 Yash Chopra, film director and producer
 Mohammed Zahur Khayyam, Indian music director
 Sukhshinder Shinda, Punjabi singer, music director, and producer
Garry Sandhu, Punjabi Singer, Actor, Song Editor

Villages
 

Bakapur
Barnala Kalan
Charan
Chuharpur
Kanaun
Kariam
Ladhian
Muna
Lodhipur

Reference

External links 

 The official website of the district
 Nawanshahr Portal
 WikiMapia

 
Districts of Punjab, India
1995 establishments in Punjab, India
 
Memorials to Bhagat Singh